Vigo is a masculine given name and an Italian surname, the latter probably derived from the Latin word vicus (neighbourhood or settlement).

It may refer to:

People
 Vigo Carlund (born 1946), Swedish businessman
 V. A. Demant (1893–1983), English priest, theologian and social commentator
 Vigo Madsen (1889–1979), Danish gymnast
 Alex Vigo (born 1999), Argentine footballer
 Élida Vigo (born 1944), Argentine politician
 Esteban Vigo (born 1955), Spanish retired footballer and coach
 Facundo Vigo (born 1999), Uruguayan footballer
 Francis Vigo (1747–1836), Italian supporter of the American Revolution
 Giovanni da Vigo (1450–1525), Italian surgeon
 Green Vigo, South African former rugby union and rugby league footballer of the 1970s and 1980s
 Íñigo Méndez de Vigo (born 1956), Spanish politician
 Jean Vigo (1905–1934), French film director
 Miriam Beizana Vigo (born 1990), Spanish writer and literary critic
 Viggo Mortensen (born 1958), American actor, author, musician, photographer, poet, and painter.

Fictional characters
 Vigo the Carpathian, villain of the film Ghostbusters II
 Vigo, a villain in the Japanese manga series Psyren
 Jason Vigo, in the Star Trek: The Next Generation episode "Bloodlines"

See also
 Viggo, a given name

Masculine given names